Limicolaria martensiana is a species of tropical air-breathing land snail, a terrestrial pulmonate gastropod mollusk in the family Achatinidae.

The specific name martensiana is in honor of German zoologist Eduard von Martens.

Distribution 
This species occurs in Africa, in the following countries:
 Tanzania
 Kenya
 Uganda

Description 

This species was originally discovered and described by the British malacologist Edgar Albert Smith in 1880. Smith's original text (the type description) reads as follows:

References
This article incorporates public domain text from the reference

Achatinidae
Gastropods described in 1880